Qareh Jeh is a village in Tamran Rural District, in the Central District of Kalaleh County, Golestan Province, Iran. At the 2006 census, its population was 251, in 53 families.

References 

Populated places in Kalaleh County